The Arizona National Scenic Trail is a National Scenic Trail from Mexico to Utah that traverses the whole north–south length of the U.S. state of Arizona. The trail begins at the Coronado National Memorial near the US–Mexico border and moves north through parts of the Huachuca, Santa Rita, and Rincon Mountains. The trail continues through the Santa Catalina north of Tucson and the Mazatzal Mountains before ascending the Mogollon Rim north of Payson, and eventually leading to the higher elevations of Northern Arizona and the San Francisco Peaks. The trail then continues across the Coconino Plateau and in and out of the Grand Canyon. The Arizona Trail terminates near the Arizona–Utah border in the Kaibab Plateau region. The trail is designed as a primitive trail for hiking, equestrians, mountain biking, and even cross country skiing, showcasing the wide variety of mountain ranges and ecosystems of Arizona.

The idea for the trail was originally developed and promoted in 1985 by Dale Shewalter, a Flagstaff, Arizona, teacher. The Arizona Trail was designated as a National Scenic Trail on March 30, 2009 by the Omnibus Public Land Management Act of 2009. It forms part of the shortened version of the  Great Western Loop. This version includes the Grand Canyon National Park.

History 
The Arizona Trail was created by interconnecting preexisting trails. In 1994, the Arizona Trail Association incorporated as a 501(c)(3) non-profit organization to bring volunteers and the necessary resources to create maps, identify water sources, build and maintain the trail, and help raise funds for the trail.

Hiking

Map of the trail 
The Arizona Trail is divided into 43 passages, and categorized into Southern, Central, and Northern sections.

Trail finishers 
Trail finishers are individuals who have reported completing the Arizona Trail. They receive a copper belt buckle (or pin/pendant) in celebration of their accomplishment. This list includes:
   Thru-hikers and segment hikers
   Speed record ultra runners
   Yo-yo’s (those who do the trail in one direction, then turn around and do it in the other direction)
   Horseback riders
   Mountain bikers
   Those who used a variety of non-motorized modes to travel along every portion of the Arizona Trail
   Some pioneers who trekked overland long before the AZT was completely built.

Trail communities 
The “AZT Gateway” provides community information (i.e., lodging, staple stores, access information, urgent care, etc.). There are many scenic communities that have fun areas of interest along the Arizona Trail.

Mountain biking 
Mountain biking is allowed but segments are off-limits due to wilderness restrictions. Preferred biking routes have been developed to retain a trail experience consistent with National Scenic Trail values.

Animals 
Some hikers enjoy the company of their canine companions when hiking the trail. However, the rough terrain, venomous snakes, sharp vegetation, hot ground during the summer, and lack of water in many trail segments can make the Arizona Trail unsuitable for most dogs, and in some sections, they are not allowed. Hikers wanting to bring their dogs should check with the Arizona Trail Association, which recommends that dog owners plan day trips in areas where dogs are allowed and when conditions (particularly heat and water) are suitable for them.

Pack goats are sometimes used as companions on the trail, and can help lessen the pain of carrying a heavy backpack. They are allowed on some parts of the Arizona Trail, but prohibited on other segments due to the possibility of diseases from domestic goats spreading to sensitive bighorn sheep populations. Pack goats are not allowed anywhere bighorn sheep live. Therefore, it's not possible to do a thru-hike with pack goats.

Trail Experiences 
As of 2015 fewer than 20 people have ridden the entire trail. Some rode the trail all at once; others who rode the trail in segments, taking up to six years.

In general, it takes approximately fifty days to hike the trail. The speed record for completing the trail is held by Jeff Garmire, who completed the Arizona trail in fifteen days, thirteen hours.

A 21-mile section along the Arizona Trail provides views in the Grand Canyon region, particularly on the Kaibab Plateau. The trail connects the East Rim View and Murray trailheads.

References

External links 
 Arizona Trail Association
 Arizona State Parks: Arizona Trail fact sheet
 Trail Segments – HikeArizona.COM
 Trailheads Map – HikeArizona.COM
 Arizona Trail Forum
 Arizona Trail Backpacking Journals
   (Coconino County)

Hiking trails in Arizona
Long-distance trails in the United States
Mogollon Rim
National Scenic Trails of the United States
Santa Catalina Mountains
Units of the National Landscape Conservation System